Likar (also Romanized as Līkar; also known as Līkar Kolā) is a village in Kuhestan Rural District, Kelardasht District, Chalus County, Mazandaran Province, Iran. At the 2006 census, its population was 155, in 41 families.

References 

Populated places in Chalus County